The Mall at Fairfield Commons, often referred to as the Fairfield Mall, is a shopping mall in Beavercreek, Ohio, United States, a suburb of Dayton. The mall was opened in 1993 and has two floors. The anchor stores are Macy's, J. C. Penney, Dick's Sporting Goods, Round 1 Entertainment, and Morris Home Furniture. There is one vacant anchor store, formerly Elder-Beerman. Located adjacent to Interstate 675, it is near a golf course, Wright-Patterson Air Force Base, Wright State University and the Nutter Center entertainment complex. The mall is located just south of the interstate on North Fairfield Road (Veterans Memorial Highway), a main thoroughfare through Beavercreek. It offers over 140 different shops, department stores and restaurants, including a food court.

The Mall at Fairfield Commons is owned by Washington Prime Group, the owners of the Dayton Mall.

History

The  store in the mall replaced two other locations in the area: one in the Airway Shopping Center in then-Mad River Township (now Riverside) and a smaller store in Xenia. The mall's basic layout is a straight concourse connected to a diagonal concourse connected to another straight concourse;  placement within the layout allows it to have two sets of interior public entrances on both floors: one set opens to the end of one of the straight concourses, while the other set opens to the middle of the other straight concourse. This configuration is unlike some malls that require customers to move through an anchor store to reach other parts of the mall; customers do not have to move through  to reach any other area of the mall.

A  Lazarus (now Macy's) opened on September 23, 1994, with the official grand opening from September 30 to October 2; the store opened almost a year later than the other four anchors due to the 1992 emergence of Lazarus' parent company, Federated Department Stores, from bankruptcy reorganization, and also due to Lazarus' earlier commitment to a competing mall project.

An  Dick's Sporting Goods store opened in 2004. Although two stories, the store's only interior public entrance is on the upper level, off the food court.

In fall 2007, The Bon-Ton Stores, owner of Elder-Beerman, converted the existing Parisian store to an additional Elder-Beerman location, housing women’s clothing, cosmetics, shoes and accessories. The existing Elder-Beerman store was reconfigured to house its men's, children's and home departments on the upper level, and a new furniture gallery on the lower level.

In April 2014, Elder-Beerman announced that it would consolidate its two mall locations back into its original location and eliminate the furniture gallery; the consolidation was complete on August 20, 2014. The vacated portion of the mall was demolished in early 2015; it was replaced between late 2015 and 2018 with six restaurants: two attached to the mall but with exterior-only public entrances, and four freestanding. An additional freestanding restaurant in the space is scheduled to open in fall 2018.

Elder-Beerman closed on August 29, 2018, due to the bankruptcy of parent company The Bon-Ton.

After a September 18, 2018 announcement that Sears would be closing as part of a plan to close 12 locations nationwide, the store closed on December 9, 2018.

The lower level of the former Sears store opened as Round One Entertainment on November 23, 2019.
 
In spite of the fact that there had yet been no announcement that the Sears store would either be vacated or reduced in size, on July 26, 2018, it was announced that The RoomPlace would open a home furniture store in the mall. Trade magazine Furniture Today claimed that a  store was then scheduled to open in fall 2019 in the upper level of the Sears space. The RoomPlace plans were confirmed on September 18, 2018, when the Sears closing was announced, and were reaffirmed as late as February 13, 2020. On February 25, 2020, it was announced that locally-based regional chain Morris Home Furniture would be opening instead in the upper level of the former Sears store, with The RoomPlace confirming two days later that it had shelved its plans to enter the Dayton market. The Morris showroom was tentatively scheduled to open in spring 2020.

From June 20 to August 2022, Morris offered a pop-up clearance and closeout location in the former Elder-Beerman space.

Non-retail uses
As of December 2020, the mall's and University Baptist Church's websites suggested that the latter congregation would be opening a location in the lower level of the former Elder-Beerman space.

On June 4, 2021, Beavercreek-headquartered developer Synergy & Mills Development announced that in partnership with the mall's owner, Washington Prime Group, it would convert the entire former Elder-Beerman building into office, laboratory, and research and development space. The over $10 million project, to be called "The Meridian", would be built on spec starting in late 2021. The developers expect the complex to be popular with defense contractors due to nearby Wright-Patterson Air Force Base, but will also market the space to prospective tenants in other industries. As of June 2021, it is unknown when Mosaic and University Baptist churches will be expected to leave their spaces.

From January 14 through February 27, 2022, "Michelangelo’s Sistine Chapel: The Exhibition", a traveling art exhibit reproducing the frescos on the Sistine Chapel ceiling, appeared at the mall in the upper level of the former Elder-Beerman store.

References

External links
Official Website

Shopping malls in Ohio
Shopping malls established in 1993
Economy of Dayton, Ohio
Buildings and structures in Greene County, Ohio
Washington Prime Group
Tourist attractions in Greene County, Ohio
Beavercreek, Ohio
1993 establishments in Ohio